Gariahat Road becomes Raja SC Mullick road from the intersection of Prince Anwar Shah Road Connector and traverses mainly through Jadavpur and then the inner parts of South Kolkata and ends at Garia, where it meets the Netaji Subash Chandra Bose Road.

Localities
Formerly known as Lady Willingdon Road and starting from the Jadavpur P.S. at its north end, it traverses about four kilometers to Garia through many important landmarks like the Central Glass and Ceramic Research Institute, Jadavpur University, Indian Association of Cultivation of Science, Indian Institute of Chemical Biology and KPC Medical College & Hospital.

The intersection of Raja SC Mullick Road and Central Road is a very busy place with the 8B bus stand, numerous shops, restaurants, Jadavpur Railway Station, Auto Rickshaw stands and Government Offices in its vicinity.

Food joints
The 8B bus stand junction on this road is very crowded but it offers a variety of restaurants, food stalls and confectionaries on Central Road. There are air-conditioned restaurants such as Banzara, Blue Lagoon. Then there are small snack shops selling Chicken patties and other snacks such as Sugar and Spice, Bake Club. There are a number of confectionaries selling a large variety of Bengali sweets. These are Hindustan Sweets, Shri Krishna Mistanna Bhandar, Kamdhenu, Ganguram to name a few. Finally, there are several nameless stalls on the road selling rolls (chicken, egg-chicken etc.) and a Kolkata street variety of Chow Mein and Chili Chicken. Besides the local population, the students and faculties of Jadavpur University are also customers of these stores.

Landmarks
 Central Glass and Ceramic Research Institute 
 Indian Association for the Cultivation of Science
 Jadavpur University
 KPC Medical College and Hospital

Apartment Complex
On S.C.Mullick Road, three big apartment complexes have come up recently. They are Ekta Heights, Orbit City and West Wind. These are gated communities with several multistoried apartment buildings in each. Each complex also has facilities like gym, swimming pool, car parking for residents, security guard. Some complexes also provide Tennis Court, standby generator (used during power cuts), garbage collection.

External links
 Jadavpur University
 Indian Association for the Cultivation of Science
 Indian Institute of Chemical Biology
 Dinabandhu Andrews College

See also

Roads in Kolkata